George Gordon (1760–1845) was an English Anglican priest, Dean of Exeter between 1809 and 1810; and of Lincoln from then until his death on 2 August 1845.

References

1760 births
1845 deaths
Deans of Exeter
Deans of Lincoln